Georgetown is a census-designated place (CDP) in Wilkes-Barre Township, Luzerne County, Pennsylvania, United States, adjacent to the city of Wilkes-Barre. The CDP population was 1,640 at the 2010 census.

Geography

Georgetown occupies most of the southwestern half of Wilkes-Barre Township and is bisected by I-81/PA 309. Exit 165 of I-81 is located at the southwestern edge of the CDP. The city of Wilkes-Barre is to the northwest.

References

Census-designated places in Luzerne County, Pennsylvania
Census-designated places in Pennsylvania